Swathi Thirunal  is a 1987 Indian Malayalam-language biographical film co-written and directed by Lenin Rajendran. The film is based on the life of Swathi Thirunal Rama Varma, the Maharaja of Travancore. It stars Anant Nag in the title role, with Srividya, Nedumudi Venu and Murali in other important roles. The cinematographer was Madhu Ambat.

Plot 
The story begins with Gowri Lakshmi Bayi entrusting the four-month-old Swathi Thirunal Rama Varma to the care of the English East India Company whose representative was Col. Munro. Then it cuts to when Swathi Thirunal is sixteen and takes over the reins of Travancore from his aunt Gowri Parvati Bayi. Swathi Thirunal's biography is then shown against the backdrop of the music that he himself has composed. The movie ends with his death in 1846.

Cast 
 Anant Nag as Swathi Thirunal Rama Varma  (voice dubbed by Venu Nagavally)
 Srividya as Gowri Parvati Bayi
 Nedumudi Venu as Irayimman Thampi
 Murali as Shadkala Govinda Marar
 Ambika as Narayani Panam Pillai Amma Kochamma
 Babu Namboothiri as Diwanji Subbaravu
 Ranjini as Sugandhavalli
 Jagannathan as Vadivelu
 Innocent as Krishna Ravu
 Kaithapram Damodaran Namboothiri as singer
 Ravi Vallathol as singer
 Kanakalatha as Narayani's Thozhi
 Mehboob Sait ( guest role )
 Kuyili as dancer
 Sujatha Thiruvananthapuram

Production 
After Anant Nag's Kannada film Narada Vijaya (1980) was dubbed into Malayalam and performed well in the Kerala box office, the director Lenin Rajendran and cinematographer Madhu Ambat approached him to portray Swathi Thirunal Rama Varma in their biopic of him. Though initially reluctant, he ultimately agreed. Actor Saikumar was initially offered the lead role, but he later made his debut in Ramji Rao Speaking (1989). ( In return, Nag told Rajendran about the work of art director P. Krishnamoorthy whom he had worked with in  Hamsageethe and the latter made his debut in Malayalam through this film.

Soundtrack 

The film's original music was composed by M. B. Sreenivasan. The soundtrack features vocals of several singers including M. Balamuralikrishna, who received a State award for his work.

Additional tracks from the movie

Awards 
Kerala State Film Awards:
 Special Jury Award – Lenin Rajendran
 Special Jury Award – M.B Sreenivasan
 Best Play Back Singer – M. Balamuralikrishna
Best Art Director – P. Krishnamoorthy

References

External links 
 

1980s Malayalam-language films
1980s musical films
1987 films
Films directed by Lenin Rajendran
Indian biographical films
Films scored by M. B. Sreenivasan